Big Money! is a puzzle video game created by PopCap Games.

Gameplay 
The game takes place on a grid full of colored coins. There are five colors of coins: red, blue, yellow, green, and purple. Purple coins only appear in puzzle mode. Like in Collapse! and SameGame, the player must click on groups of three or more (in puzzle mode, two or more) same colored coins to make them disappear. On the side of the screen is the "Money Meter". It is increased by removing coins from the board, and once it is filled up, a money bag will drop into the playfield. It is collected if the coins underneath it are removed (in puzzle mode, it is collected when it is dropped to the bottom). When the player collects the required amount of money bags, the next level will begin.

The game has two main modes. In "Action Mode", the coins rise constantly, while in "Strategy Mode", the coins will only rise when the player clears a group. In the full version only, there is also a "Puzzle Mode", where the player must clear a certain coin arrangement.

External links 

2002 video games
Palm OS games
PopCap games
Puzzle video games
Video game clones
Video games developed in the United States
Video games scored by Peter Hajba
Windows games

Single-player video games